Betty L. Mullis is a retired USAF command pilot born in Kansas. She is now a civilian airline pilot. Joining the USAF in 1972, she had a 33-year service career in the USAF, before she retired in 2005. During her service, she was awarded the Legion of Merit and the Air Force Distinguished Service Medal and achieved the rank of Major-General.

Military career 
Mullis began her career in the Arkansas Air National Guard (ANG), where she was one of the first women in there to earn her wings. In 1988, she transitioned to the Air Force Reserve. In 1993, Mullis took command of a flying squadron and became the first woman in the Air Force Reserve to do so. She became the first woman in the US Air Force to command a flying wing in 1996. Mullis went on to become the first female command pilot in the US Air Force to reach the rank of Brigadier-General in 2000 and attained Major-General in 2002.

Awards
According to the US Air Force, she has been awarded the following decorations:
Air Force Distinguished Service Medal
Legion of Merit
Meritorious Service Medal with oak leaf cluster 
Air Medal
Aerial Achievement Medal
Air Force Commendation Medal with oak leaf cluster 
Air Force Achievement Medal
Air Force Outstanding Unit Award with "V" device and four oak leaf clusters 
Combat Readiness Medal with four oak leaf clusters 
National Defense Service Medal with bronze star 
Southwest Asia Service Medal with two bronze stars 
Armed Forces Service Medal
Air Force Longevity Award with silver oak leaf clusters 
Armed Forces Reserve Medal
Small Arms Marksmanship Ribbon with bronze star 
Air Force Training Ribbon 
Kuwait Liberation Medal (Kingdom of Saudi Arabia)

References

Living people
Year of birth missing (living people)
People from Kansas
Recipients of the Legion of Merit
Recipients of the Air Force Distinguished Service Medal